The 2001 Winter Universiade, the XX Winter Universiade, took place in Zakopane, Poland.

Medal table

Sports
 Figure skating

External links
 FISU - Zakopane 2001 Winter Universiade

 
2001
Universiade
Universiade
Universiade 2001
Sports competitions in Zakopane
Multi-sport events in Poland
Winter Universiade
Winter sports competitions in Poland